Tessy-Bocage is a commune in the department of Manche, northwestern France. The municipality was established on 1 January 2016 by merger of the former communes of Fervaches and Tessy-sur-Vire (the seat). On 1 January 2018, the former commune of Pont-Farcy (part of the department of Calvados before 2018) was merged into it.

See also 
Communes of the Manche department

References  

Communes of Manche
Populated places established in 2016
2016 establishments in France